Adavi is a village in Mawal taluka of Pune district in the state of Maharashtra, India. It is near to National Highway 4.

Administration
The village is administrated by a sarpanch, an elected representative who leads a gram panchayat. At the time of the 2011 Census of India, the gram panchayat governed two villages and was based at Adhe Khurd.

Demographics
At the 2011 census, the village comprised 79 households. The population of 470 was split between 229 males and 241 females.

See also
List of villages in Mawal taluka

References

Villages in Mawal taluka